Springfield High School is a public high school in Springfield Township, Delaware County, Pennsylvania, in the Philadelphia metropolitan area. It is a part of the Springfield School District. In addition to Springfield Township, its attendance zone includes the borough of Morton.

History
Prior to the school's establishment, Springfield families could choose to send their children to Lansdowne High School, Media High School, or Swarthmore High School. Springfield High was established in 1931. The building originally had 13 classrooms. Harvey Saybold was the first principal.

Earl R. Knorr became the principal in 1970.

In 1977 a fire destroyed the original building.

Knorr retired in 1990.

The district began planning for it circa 2009. In 2015 the school board voted to build a new facility, with eight in favor and one, Bruce Lord, against. The former baseball field was chosen as the site of the new building. Construction began in 2018. The previous main gymnasium and stadium were dismantled as part of the process. By summer 2019 the school's steel structure had been established.  the estimated cost was $130 million. 
The new high school was completed in late 2020, and was later opened to students and staff in 2021.

Campus
The Frances "Chickie" Giuffre Dining Center Complex and Katherine G. “Kay” Voglesong Bus Driver Commons Room in the new building are named after former employees. Giuffre's son Nicholas Giuffre gave the Springfield Area Education Foundation $1 million, and the cafeteria and bus driver room were in turn named after his mother and his mother-in-law. The son was a member of the Class of 1974.

In the old campus, Knorr is the namesake of the theater.

Culture
The "Festival of the Arts" was established by Knorr.

References

External links
 Springfield High School

Schools in Delaware County, Pennsylvania
Public high schools in Pennsylvania
Springfield Township, Delaware County, Pennsylvania